Hamdamabad (also Romanized as Hamdamābād) 
This village is located in Tasuj Rural District, in the Kavar city for political reasons, but in fact it geographicall Location is, Iran Country, Fars Province, Kavar city. Due to the increase in the population of Tasuj Rural District, and its transformation into a district, the officials have added this village to Tasuj Rural District. According to the census of the Statistics Center of Iran in 1395, its population was 211 people (46 families). And the census of the Statistics Center of Iran in 1395, its population was 211 people (50 families) including 4 men and 24 women

References 

Populated places in Kavar County